XHHU-FM is a radio station on 89.9 FM in Martínez de la Torre, Veracruz. It is affiliated to the Los 40 Principales network from Televisa Radio.

History
XEHU-AM 1300, a 500-watt station received its concession on March 13, 1959. Power was later raised from 500 to 5,000 watts daytime, but dropped back to 250 watts.

In the late 1970s, XEHU spawned a sister station, XEHU-FM 104.5, the only FM station with an XE- callsign in southern Mexico.

XEHU moved to FM in 2012 as XHHU-FM 89.9.

References

Radio stations in Veracruz
Radio stations established in 1959